The North Korea national under-17 football team, represents North Korea in association football at an under-17 age level and is controlled by the DPR Korea Football Association, the governing body for football in North Korea.

Competition history

2010 AFC Under-16 Football Championship
In 2010, North Korea won the AFC U-16 Championship for the first time in their history. The team's first match was a 1–1 draw to Syria on 24 October 2010 with Ri Kwang-Il scoring the goal for North Korea. North Korea then finished the group stage with a 2–0 victory over Iran and a 2–1 victory over Oman to top the group. North Korea then won the quarter-final match against Jordan on 1 November 2010 4–0. North Korea then secured their spot in the final on 4 November 2010 by defeating Japan 2–1. North Korea then defeated hosts Uzbekistan in the final on 7 November 2010 to secure their first-ever championship.

Competition Records

FIFA U-17 World Cup record

AFC U-16 Championship record

*Denotes draws includes knockout matches decided on penalty kicks. Red border indicates that the tournament was hosted on home soil. Gold, silver, bronze backgrounds indicates 1st, 2nd and 3rd finishes respectively. Bold text indicates best finish in tournament.

Current squad

The following players were selected to compete in the 2017 FIFA U-17 World Cup.

Head coach:  Kim Yong-su

References

u17
Asian national under-17 association football teams